7 Up is a brand of lemon-lime soda.

7 Up or Seven Up may also refer to:

Films
Seven Up!, a 1964 documentary film in the Up Series
The Seven-Ups, a 1973 American crime thriller film

Games
Seven Up (game) or Heads Up Seven Up, a children's game
Seven Up (card game) or All Fours, a card game

Other uses
Seven Up (novel), a 2001 novel by Janet Evanovich
Seven Up, a 1972 album by Ash Ra Tempel
Seven Up, a candy bar formerly made by Pearson's Candy Company